{{infobox rugby biography
| name           = Chris Mayor
| image          = 
| image_size     = 
| caption        = 
| alt            = 
| birth_name     = Chris Mayor
| birth_date     = 
| birth_place    = Wigan, England
| death_date     = 
| death_place    = 
| height         = 
| weight         =  
| school         = St John’s RC High School
| university     = Edge Hill
| spouse         = 
| children       = 
| relatives      = 
| occupation     = rugby league and rugby union footballer
| rl_position    = 
| rl_proclubs1   = Wigan Warriors
| rl_clubyears1  = 2000-03
| rl_clubpoints1 =
| rl_clubapps1   =
| ru_currentteam         = 
| ru_position            = Centre
| ru_youthyears          =  
| ru_clubyears           = 2003–082008–102010-112011-162016-182018-19
| ru_proclubs            = Sale SharksNorthampton SaintsGran ParmaWaspsSale FCSouthport
Invitational:Barbarian F.C.County side: Lancashire ''| ru_clubcaps            = 87 35 20 56  42  17
| ru_clubpoints          = (80)(20)(40)(15) (65) (30)
| ru_clubupdate          = 5 May 2019
| repsevensyears1 = 2008
| repsevensteam1  = England
| repsevenscomp1  = Hong Kong
| ru_coachyears          = 2018-19
| ru_coachclubs          = Southport (assistant head coach)
| ru_refereeyears        = 
| ru_refereecomps        = 
| ru_refereeapps         = 
}}Chris Mayor''' (born 19 May 1982) is an English former professional rugby league and rugby union footballer who played in the 2000s and 2010s. He played for Wigan Warriors, and most recently played rugby union for Southport in the RFU's Lancs/Cheshire Division 1.

Mayor's position of choice is as a centre and he can also operate in any position in the back-line.

In the 2005–2006 season, Mayor played as a replacement and scored a try in the final as Sale Sharks won their first ever Premiership title. Mayor joined Northampton Saints at the end of the 2007–2008 season. He was largely used as substitute due to the impressive performances of Joe Ansbro and James Downey.

Mayor was linked with a return to rugby league with former club Wigan Warriors, that was never realised.

Mayor was part of the Sale FC Rugby National 2 North Championship team promoted to National One in May 2018.

June 2018 Mayor was appointed as player coach at Merseyside based club, Southport RFC working alongside head coach Neil Ryan. At the end of the season Mayor left his role at Southport.

In July 2022, Mayor was banned "from all sport for four years for attempting to use and traffic a banned human growth hormone to provide relief for his seriously ill father".

References

External links
Sale Sharks profile

1982 births
Living people
English rugby league players
English rugby union coaches
English rugby union players
Northampton Saints players
Rugby articles needing expert attention
Rugby league centres
Rugby league players from Wigan
Rugby union centres
Rugby union players from Wigan
Sale Sharks players
Wasps RFC players
Wigan Warriors players